Banks is a ghost town in Osborne County, Kansas, United States.

History
Banks was never a ghost town by any stretch of the imagination, but it was a rural post office in a farmhouse - nothing more. The Banks post office was organized in 1880. The post office was discontinued in 1888.  There is nothing left of Banks.

References

Former populated places in Osborne County, Kansas
Former populated places in Kansas